The former IETF Administrative Oversight Committee (IAOC) was part of the support organization for the Internet Engineering Task Force (IETF).

The Committee, whose purpose and organization was given in RFC 4071 (now obsolete), oversaw the IETF secretariat and related functions. It had a purely administrative role in selection of meeting locations, looking after the finances and administrative functions of the IETF. It had no technical role in the setting of Internet standards.

Its members were appointed by the IETF Nominating Committee (NomCom), composed of randomly chosen volunteers who participate regularly at meetings, which is vested with the power to appoint, reappoint, and remove members of the IESG, IAB, IASA, and previously the IAOC.), the IESG, IAB and ISOC Board of Trustees for 2 years terms. And ex-officio members were the IETF Chair (ex officio), IAB Chair (ex officio) and ISOC President/CEO (ex officio).

Its appointed members were also members of the IETF Trust, which holds the IPR of the IETF.

It was abolished when the IETF restructured its administration with RFC 8711 (BCP 101).

References

 : Structure of the IETF Administrative Support Activity (IASA)
 : Structure of the IETF Administrative Support Activity, Version 2.0

Chairs
The IAOC Chairperson was selected by the IAOC members for a 1-year renewable term.

 Lucy Lynch (2006-2007)
 Kurtis Lindqvist (2007-2008)
 Jonne Soininen (2008-2009)
 Bob Hinden (2009-2014)
 Chris Griffiths (2013-2014)
 Tobias Gondrom (2015-)

External links
 IAOC website

Internet governance organizations